Víctor Hugo Barros (born 25 May 1961 in Porto Alegre) is a Brazilian former football player and football manager.

Career
In 2004 and since 2014 he coached the Puerto Rico national football team.

References

Living people
1961 births
Footballers from Porto Alegre
Brazilian footballers
Brazilian football managers
Expatriate football managers in Puerto Rico
Place of birth missing (living people)
Sport Club Internacional players
Clube Esportivo Bento Gonçalves players
Coritiba Foot Ball Club players
Esporte Clube Juventude players
Grêmio Foot-Ball Porto Alegrense players
Sociedade Esportiva Palmeiras players
Sociedade Esportiva e Recreativa Caxias do Sul players
Clube Esportivo Aimoré players
Botafogo Futebol Clube (PB) players
Puerto Rico national football team managers

Association footballers not categorized by position